Flash vacuum pyrolysis (FVP) is a technique in organic synthesis.  It entails heating a precursor molecule intensely and briefly.  Two key parameters are the temperature and duration (or residence time), which are adjusted to optimize yield, conversion, and avoidance of intractable products.  Often the experiment entails volatilizing a precursor, which is drawn through a "hot zone" followed by rapid condensation.  The apparatus typically is conducted under dynamic vacuum.  The hot zone must impart heat to the gaseous molecules, so it is generally packed with solids to induce gas-solid collisions.  The packing material is generally chemically inert, such as quartz.  The precursor (i) volatilizes with gentle heating and under vacuum, (ii) the precursor fragments or rearranges in the hot zone, and finally (iii) the products are collected by rapid cooling. Rapid post-reaction cooling and the dilution inherent in gases both suppress bimolecular degradation pathways.

Examples
The technique is applied to conversions that proceed via unimolecular pathways.  2-Acetoxydioxane, when heated at 425 °C converts to the highly reactive dioxene, via loss of acetic acid.
  2-Furonitrile has been prepared by flash-dehydration of 2-furoic acid amide or oxime over molecular sieves. The strained ring benzocyclobutenone has been prepared by FVP from a simple benzoyl chloride precursor.

References

Pyrolysis
Organic reactions
Chemical processes